The third Mundialito de Clubes (Club World Cup in English) is a beach soccer tournament that took place, for the first time, at a temporary stadium at Copacabana Beach in Rio de Janeiro, Brazil from 10 – 17 November 2013. The previous two editions were held at the Praia do Sol stadium at the Arena Guarapiranga sport complex, located near Represa de Guarapiranga, a reservoir located in São Paulo, Brazil.

Participating teams
Eight teams confirmed their participation in this year's tournament, a decrease of four teams who participated in the previous edition:

Squads

Group stage
The draw to divide the teams into two groups of four was conducted on 21 October 2013. The official schedule was released on 22 October 2013.

All kickoff times are of local time in Rio de Janeiro (UTC-2).

Group A

Group B

Knockout stage

Semifinals

Third place playoff

Final

Winners

Awards

See also
Beach soccer
Beach Soccer Worldwide

References

External links
Beach Soccer Worldwide
Beach Soccer Brasil (Portuguese)
Mundialito de Clubes de Beach Soccer (Portuguese)

Mundialito de Clubes
Mundialito De Clubes
2013
International sports competitions in Rio de Janeiro (city)
2013 in beach soccer